Martin McCloskey (born 22 September 1964 from Derry City) is an Irish professional darts player who played in British Darts Organisation tournaments.

Darts career
McCloskey reached the semi-finals of the 1999 WDF World Cup Men's singles, beating England captain Martin Adams in the first round, and Ritchie Davies in the last-16, before beating Belgium's Chris Van den Bergh 4–0 in the quarter-finals. He was eventually beaten by Raymond van Barneveld, who went on to lift the title. McCloskey won the 2008 Republic of Ireland Open, beating Damien O'Driscoll in the final.

McCloskey made his Lakeside debut in the 2010 BDO World Championship after winning one of four places in the Inter-Playoffs in Bridlington. He defeated Steve West in the first round after being 2–1 down in sets. However, he was defeated by Garry Thompson in the second round by 4 sets to 1.

McCloskey failed to qualify for the 2011 World Championship, but he did play in the 2010 Winmau World Masters, where he reached the semi-finals. He was defeated by Martin Adams, who won the title.

World Championship Results

BDO
2010: 2nd Round (lost to Garry Thompson 1–4)

External links
Martin McCloskey - Profile and stats Darts Database

Irish darts players
Living people
1964 births
British Darts Organisation players